Haggle is a European Union funded project in Situated and Autonomic Communications.

Haggle is an autonomic networking architecture designed to enable communication when network connectivity is intermittent. In particular, Haggle exploits opportunistic contacts between mobile users to deliver data to the destination.

See also
 Delay-tolerant networking
 Haggle

References

External links
Haggle Architecture and Software Platform at Google code.
Haggle at Institute for Computer Communications and Applications

Academic computer network organizations